Gilman Louie (born 1960) is an American technology venture capitalist who got his start as a video game designer and then co-founded and ran the CIA venture capital fund In-Q-Tel. With his company Nexa Corporation he designed and developed multiple computer games such as the F-16 Fighting Falcon flight simulator series. His company later merged with Spectrum Holobyte where he was CEO until its acquisition by Hasbro, after which he became Chief Creative Officer and General Manager of its Games.com group. He has served on a number of boards of directors, including Wizards of the Coast, Niantic, Total Entertainment Network, FASA Interactive, Wickr, Aerospike, the Chinese American International School, Markle Foundation, and Digital Promise. He is chairman of the Federation of American Scientists and Vricon.

Early life and education
Louie was born in San Francisco. He graduated in 1983 from San Francisco State University with a Bachelor of Science degree in business administration. In 1997, he attended the then thirteen-week Advanced Management Program (AMP) and International Senior Management Program (ISMP) at Harvard Business School.

Career

Video games 
He built a career in the video game industry, founding a company in 1981 while still in college. He called it NEXA Corporation, based on a department at SFSU that was a combination of the humanities and the sciences. In 1986 his company merged with Spectrum Holobyte via a shell company called Sphere, Inc., with Louie as CEO, and then he became CEO of Spectrum Holobyte in 1992. In 1992 he acquired MicroProse. His most prominent games were when he designed and developed the F-16 Fighting Falcon flight simulator series {1984–1998) and he licensed Tetris (1987), one of the world's most popular video games, from its developers in the Soviet Union, then updating it for an American market. His company was acquired by Hasbro Interactive in 1998, where Louie served as Chief Creative Officer and general manager of the Games.com group.

Venture capital 
In 1999 he co-founded and became the CEO of the non-profit Peleus (later In-Q-It and then In-Q-Tel). It was a company created with $30 million in seed money from the US federal government, and intended to help enhance national security by connecting the United States Intelligence Community with venture-backed entrepreneurial companies and making venture capital style investments in new technologies. 

As of 2021, Louie is a partner of Alsop Louie Partners, a venture capital fund focused on helping entrepreneurs start companies. Known investments of Alsop Louie Partners include Niantic, Inc., Wickr, Cleversafe, Ribbit, Zephyr Technologies, Gridspeak, Netwitness, and LookingGlass Cyber Solutions.

Board activities 
Louie has served on a number of boards of directors, including Wizards of the Coast, Total Entertainment Network, Direct Language, FASA Interactive, Netwitness, Motive Medical, Wickr, Gridspeak, the National Venture Capital Association (NVCA), Zephyr Technologies, the CIA Officers Memorial Foundation, Aerospike, GreatSchools and the Chinese American International School in San Francisco. He serves on the board of the Markle Foundation and is on the boards of Greatschools.org and Digital Promise.  Louie is chairman of the Federation of American Scientists as well as the Mandarin Institute. In September 2015, he was elected Chairman of the Board for a US-based 3D Geospatial Mapping company called Vricon.

Other activities
In 2018, Louie was appointed to the United States National Security Commission for Artificial Intelligence. Gilman served as vice chairman of the standing committee on Technology, Insight-Gauge, Evaluate and Review for the United States National Academies. He also chaired the committee on Forecasting Future Disruptive Technologies for the United States National Academies that produced two reports.

In 2009, representing his company Alsop Louie Partners, he sat as a member of the committee for The Symposium on Avoiding Technology Surprise for Tomorrow's Warfighter working alongside Raytheon.

In May 2022, Louie was appointed to serve as a member of the President's Intelligence Advisory Board.

Credits 
Video games designed, programmed and/or produced:
 Falcon 4.0 (1998), MicroProse
 Falcon Gold (1994), Spectrum HoloByte
 Falcon 3.0: MiG-29 (1993), Spectrum HoloByte
 Falcon 3.0: Hornet (1993), Spectrum HoloByte
 Falcon 3.0: Operation Fighting Tiger (1992), Spectrum HoloByte
 Falcon 3.0 (1991), Spectrum HoloByte
 Crisis in the Kremlin (1991), Spectrum HoloByte
 Super Tetris (1991), Spectrum HoloByte
 Stunt Driver (1990), Spectrum HoloByte
 Tank: The M1A1 Abrams Battle Tank Simulation (1989), Spectrum HoloByte
 Falcon AT (1989), Spectrum HoloByte
 Vette! (1989), Spectrum HoloByte
 L.A. Crackdown (1988), Epyx
 Falcon (1987), Spectrum HoloByte
 Captain Cosmo (1984), ASCII Corporation
 F-16 Fighting Falcon (1984), ASCII Corporation, Sega
 World's Greatest Football (1984) Epyx
 Starship Simulator (1984), ASCII Corporation
 Delta Squadron (1983), Nexa Corporation
 Starship Commander (1981), Voyager Software
 Battle Trek (1981), Voyager Software

Awards
1988 George Washington High School (San Francisco) Hall of Merit
1988 Excellence in Software Awards (Codie awards), Software and Information Industry Association (formerly the Software Publishers Association): Best Technical Achievement, Best Simulation, Best Action/Strategy Game for Falcon
1993 Asian Business League's Distinguished Entrepreneur of the Year
1995 San Francisco State University Hall of Fame
2002 Scientific American Fifty
2004 Potomac Institute for Policy Studies Navigator Award
2005 Federal 100 Award, Federal Computer Week
2006 National Geospatial Intelligence Agency medallion for outstanding service and support to the National Geospatial Intelligence Agency while serving as CEO and President of In-Q-Tel
2006 CIA Agency Seal Medallions (2) for his service to the intelligence community
2006 Director's Award by the Director of the Central Intelligence Agency, Porter Goss, for his service in creating In-Q-Tel and providing service to the intelligence community
2007 Order of the Silver Helmet, Delta Sigma Pi
2008 Director of National Intelligence Medallion for service towards establishing an environment of equality, diversity and inclusion within the Intelligence Community
2021 Tech Titans, by the Washingtonian (magazine) for Cybersecurity
2021 Theodore Roosevelt Government Leadership Award by Government Executive for significant, lasting achievements around emerging technologies and cybersecurity

References

External links

 Markle.org
 Fas.org
 Nextgenerationproject.org
  - Lecture by Gilman Louie on the topic of starting a business, with conventional wisdom from the world of venture capital
 Report of the National Commission for Review of the Research and Development Programs of the United States Intelligence Community 

1960 births
American video game designers
American entertainment industry businesspeople
Living people
MicroProse people
American people of Chinese descent
San Francisco State University alumni